Inverness is a suburban village in Cook County, Illinois, United States. Per the 2020 census, the population was 7,616.

Geography
Inverness is located at  (42.113275, -88.098433).

The village borders are defined by Barrington Road to the west, Roselle Road to the east, Algonquin Road to the south, and Dundee Road to the north.

History

The Inverness area was first settled in 1836 by George Ela and became known as Deer Grove. After surveying the township area, in 1840 the US government offered land in the area for $1.25 per acre. By 1854, rail service was established to Deer Grove, and in 1859 the line was incorporated into the Chicago and North Western Railway system. The Inverness area was now easily accessible to Chicago. The frontier had been opened.

In 1926, Mr. Arthur T. McIntosh, one of Chicago's leading land developers, bought the Temple farm and house, which was originally built by Ralph Atkinson. It was the first of eleven parcels to be acquired by him. These lands, combined with the acquisition of the Cudahy Company Golf Course, comprised  for development. With the area under McIntosh's control, it became known as Inverness, after the McIntosh clan home in Scotland.

An important person during this early development was Way Thompson, who preserved the natural beauty of the area by laying out the road system to take advantage of the rolling land and by subdividing lots to conform to natural contours. Thompson also approved all house plans and where they were located on the lots. The first ten homes were even decorated by his wife, Barbara. The first new homes were occupied by 1939. These homes were mostly situated around the edge of the Inverness Golf Club and were designed to be affordable to young couples. They were priced from $9,500 to $20,000. McIntosh built the first 20 homes. After that, the homes were custom built for individuals who purchased lots from McIntosh.

Construction in Inverness was halted during World War II. During the early post-war years, the McIntosh Company had complete control over the sale of lots as well as the resale of homes. Placement of homes was carefully controlled to protect the character of the community.

In 1962, Inverness was incorporated as a village to be governed by a president and board of trustees. The first meeting of the village board was July 5, 1962 and was held at the Field House, which was then at the western edge of the village. In the spring of 1977 the Village Hall was relocated to a 100-year-old farmhouse on Palatine Road. It was again relocated in 1985 to its present location at the Four Silos, which has become a famous landmark and gateway to the community.

During the 1970s and '80s, the village continued to grow at a pace that exceeded earlier predictions. Homes became larger and styles were more varied. It was also during this period that the village annexed large areas of existing homes in unincorporated Cook County, which laid the foundation for further annexations to the west, which continued to expand the village limits to what they are today. Williamsburg Village, the only business development in Inverness, was started in 1981.

Demographics
As of the 2020 census there were 7,616 people, 2,842 households, and 2,300 families residing in the village. The racial makeup of the village was 78.02% White, 15.86% Asian, 0.56% African American, 0.04% Native American, 0.04% Pacific Islander, 0.88% from other races, and 4.60% from two or more races. Hispanic or Latino of any race were 3.44% of the population.

There were 2,842 households, out of which 57.32% had children under the age of 18 living with them, 74.31% were married couples living together, 4.01% had a female householder with no husband present, and 19.07% were non-families. 16.36% of all households were made up of individuals, and 11.19% had someone living alone who was 65 years of age or older. The average household size was 3.10 and the average family size was 2.76.

The village's age distribution consisted of 21.7% under the age of 18, 4.2% from 18 to 24, 12.4% from 25 to 44, 34.8% from 45 to 64, and 26.7% who were 65 years of age or older. The median age was 52.6 years. For every 100 females, there were 96.1 males. For every 100 females age 18 and over, there were 96.3 males.

The median income for a household in the village was $185,558, and the median income for a family was $204,056. Males had a median income of $134,300 versus $59,861 for females. The per capita income for the village was $82,512. About 0.9% of families and 2.6% of the population were below the poverty line, including none of those under age 18 and 1.7% of those age 65 or over.

Note: the US Census treats Hispanic/Latino as an ethnic category. This table excludes Latinos from the racial categories and assigns them to a separate category. Hispanics/Latinos can be of any race.

Education
Public schools are managed by either Barrington District 220 or School District 15 and Township High School District 211 . The village is also home to the Holy Family Catholic Academy. Established in 2002, the Academy is a Catholic school, part of the Roman Catholic Archdiocese of Chicago, that educates around 300 students in grades PK-8.

References

External links
Village of Inverness official website

Villages in Illinois
Villages in Cook County, Illinois
Chicago metropolitan area
Populated places established in 1836
1836 establishments in Illinois